Lara Uebersax (born 1 June 1999) is a Liechtensteiner footballer who plays as a defender for Triesen and the Liechtenstein national football team.

Career statistics

International

References

1999 births
Living people
Women's association football defenders
Liechtenstein women's international footballers
Liechtenstein women's footballers